Cybrid is the fourth studio album by Deathline International, released on June 5, 2001 by COP International. The album peaked at #17 on the CMJ RPM Charts in the U.S.

Reception
CMJ described the music of Cybrid as "dark, mechanized dance beats topped with abrasive industrial noise" and exclaimed "it's all here: random samples that sound like they're from Subgenius meditation tapes, distorted back-of-the-throat shouting, factory-floor beats, chunky guitars...and melodic keyboards." Jean Battiato of KSJS listed the album as one of his top picks for CMJ New Music Report in 2001. Industrial Reviews gave the album two stars out of five and criticized the slower tempo compositions while noting that more success was achieved with the faster paced dance songs. The New Empire said "Cybrid contains 11 tracks with club-potential" and "powerful beats are dominating the sound and sometimes Detahline Int'l becomes a real European EBM-touch" StarVox Music Zine said the music represents a "delightful rebirth of the concept of strong vocals and the (re)affirmations that EBM industrial programming and guitars can coexist" and "the only shortcomings of the album was that there was almost too much of a rigidity in percussiveness and in sound composition."

Track listing

Personnel
Adapted from the Cybrid liner notes.

Deathline International
 Eric Gottesman – guitar
 Maurice Jackson (as M.O.) – vocals, keyboards, programming, producer, additional engineering
 Steve Lam (as Slam) – synthesizer, guitar, additional producer
 Marisa Lenhardt – soprano vocals
 Nikki Soandso (as Nik[e]) – live engineering
 Christian Petke (as The Count [0]) – vocals, keyboards, programming, producer, engineering

Additional performers
 G.W. Childs – drums, keyboards
 Corey Gunderson (The_Gun) – keyboards
 Nial McGaughey – guitar
 Ryan Paul – guitar
 Jay Tye – vocals
 Steve Watkins – electronics, drums

Production and design
 Steph Dumais – cover art
 Stefan Noltemeyer – mastering

Release history

References

External links 
 Cybrid at Discogs (list of releases)
  Cybrid at Bandcamp
 Cybrid at iTunes

2001 albums
Deathline International albums
COP International albums